TV Shopper, also known as Your Television Shopper or Kathi Norris' Television Shopper, was an early American daytime television series which aired on the DuMont Television Network at 10:30 am ET from November 1, 1948 to December 1, 1950.

The show was hosted by Kathi Norris, also host of DuMont's Spin the Picture, and was an early example of a TV shopping show. Johnny Stearns recalled that his wife Mary Kay had received an offer to be a model for this or a similar program, but, at his request, refused and instead did television's first sitcom, Mary Kay and Johnny.

Episode status
As with most DuMont Network programs, no episodes of TV Shopper are known to survive today.

See also
List of programs broadcast by the DuMont Television Network
List of surviving DuMont Television Network broadcasts
1948–49 United States network television schedule (daytime)
1949–50 United States network television schedule (daytime)

References

Bibliography
David Weinstein, The Forgotten Network: DuMont and the Birth of American Television (Philadelphia: Temple University Press, 2004) 
Alex McNeil, Total Television, Fourth edition (New York: Penguin Books, 1980) 
Tim Brooks and Earle Marsh, The Complete Directory to Prime Time Network TV Shows, Third edition (New York: Ballantine Books, 1964)

External links
TV Shopper at IMDb
DuMont historical website

DuMont Television Network original programming
Black-and-white American television shows
1948 American television series debuts
1950 American television series endings
Lost television shows